Campus Mystery is a 2015 Chinese horror thriller film directed by Er Guan. The film was released on October 16, 2015.

Cast
Le-er You
Bingqiang Chen
Manyu Yang
Zui Tao
Sitong Ye
Siwen Li
Yuxing Chen
Huixin Zheng

Reception
The film has earned  at the Chinese box office.

References

2015 horror thriller films
2015 horror films
Chinese horror thriller films